Black Wine is an American punk rock band formed in 2009 in New Brunswick, New Jersey, United States, after Jeffrey Schroeck left The Ergs! and Miranda Taylor and J Nixon left Hunchback.  The band has had four albums released on Don Giovanni Records.

Discography

Albums

EPs

References

External links
 Don Giovanni Records Official Website

Musical groups established in 2009
Pop punk groups from New Jersey
Don Giovanni Records artists